Ladyworld  is a 2018 American thriller film directed by Amanda Kramer and starring Ariela Barer, Annalise Basso, Ryan Simpkins, Odessa Adlon, and Maya Hawke. An all-female take on the 1954 novel Lord of the Flies, Ladyworld follows eight teenage girls trapped in a house together after an earthquake. As food and water run low, their sanity begins to disintegrate and they soon regress to their basic instincts.

Cast 
 Ariela Barer as Olivia
 Annalise Basso as Piper
 Ryan Simpkins as Dolly
 Odessa Adlon as Blake
 Maya Hawke as Romy
 Tatsumi Romano as Amanda
 Zora Casabere as Mallory
 Atheena Frizzell as Eden

Production
Principal photography began in January 2018 in Los Angeles, California.

Release
The film had its world premiere at Fantastic Fest in Austin, Texas on September 22, 2018. The film also screened at BFI London Film Festival and Toronto International Film Festival. After, Cleopatra Entertainment acquired North American rights to the film and set a theatrical release for August 2, 2019.

Reception
On Metacritic, the film has a weighted average score of 54 out of 100, based on 6 critics, indicating "mixed or average reviews".

References

External links
 
 

2018 films
2018 thriller films
American thriller films
Films shot in Los Angeles County, California
Films featuring an all-female cast
American feminist films
2010s English-language films
2010s feminist films
2010s American films